Madang Open is a District in Madang Province on the northern coast of mainland Papua New Guinea. Madang is known for the beauty of its ocean location. There are a large number of distinct languages spoken in the capital, Madang Town, which draws its population from Madang Province, Morobe Province and the highlands.

Members of the National Parliament

Madang Open is represented by a Member of the National Parliament.

References

Papua New Guinea
Madang Province